Don McFarlane (18 May 1926 – 5 March 2008) was a Canadian sprinter and football player. He competed in the men's 400 metres at the 1948 Summer Olympics and played football for the University of Western Ontario. He is the brother of Bob McFarlane.

References

1926 births
2008 deaths
Athletes (track and field) at the 1948 Summer Olympics
Canadian male sprinters
Olympic track and field athletes of Canada
Athletes from London, Ontario
Western Mustangs football players
Players of Canadian football from Ontario
Canadian football fullbacks